Phyllonorycter cistifoliella is a moth of the family Gracillariidae. It is known from Greece.

It is regarded a synonym of Phyllonorycter helianthemella by some authors, while other retain it as a valid species.

References

cistifoliella
Moths of Europe
Moths described in 1944